R622 road may refer to:
 R622 road (Ireland)
 R622 road (South Africa)